Harney Westwood & Riegels (or Harneys) is a global offshore law firm that provides advice on British Virgin Islands, Cayman Islands, Cyprus, Luxembourg, Bermuda and Anguilla law to an international client base that includes law firms, financial institutions, investment funds, and private individuals. They have locations in major financial centers across Europe, Asia, the Americas and the Caribbean.

In 2016 Harneys was named Offshore Law Firm of the Year by The Lawyer in its annual awards.

History
Harneys is the oldest and largest legal practice firm in the BVI.  Combined with its affiliated fiduciary services business, Harneys is the second largest private employer in the BVI. 

The firm began in 1958 when Harold Harney formed the first resident legal practice firm to be set up in the BVI. He was joined by Neville Westwood in 1967 and Michael Riegels in 1973.

Notable Harneys alumni include:
 Michael Riegels QC, inaugural chairman of the British Virgin Islands Financial Services Commission
 Dame Janice Pereira, the current Chief Justice of the Eastern Caribbean Supreme Court
 Lewis Hunte QC, former Attorney General of the British Virgin Islands
 Tamia Richards, senior Magistrate in the British Virgin Islands.
 Myron Walwyn, British Virgin Islands Minister of Government worked at Harneys as a summer intern whilst studying law.

The firm has worked closely with the government of the BVI over the years in relation to the development of the offshore finance industry in the Territory. Three of the partners of the firm formed part of the "gang of five" that drafted the original International Business Companies Act, and members of the firm were also closely involved in the drafting of subsequent key legislation including the Insolvency Act 2003, the BVI Business Companies Act 2004 and the Securities and Investment Business Act 2010.

Offices
The firm expanded steadily in terms of new offices for several years, followed by a surge of five new offices in two years in 2014–2015. The first new office was opened in Anguilla (1998), followed by London (2002), Hong Kong (2005), the Cayman Islands (2008), Cyprus (2009), Montevideo (2010), Singapore (2014), Vancouver (2014), Shanghai (2015) and Tokyo (2015). In 2013 the firm entered into a strategic alliance with BLC Chambers in Mauritius to give it Mauritius legal capability.

Practice
Specializing in corporate and commercial law, the firm is especially well known for its corporate & finance, investment funds and commercial litigation practices. It also had dedicated practice groups relating to regulatory compliance (including tax information exchange) and sanctions.

Partners at Harneys wrote the first, and to date only, legal textbook on British Virgin Islands law: British Virgin Islands Commercial Law, published by Sweet & Maxwell.

Harneys is also one of only two law firms in the world (the other being Allen & Overy) which provides official opinions to ISDA on close-out netting analysis for three or more different jurisdictions (BVI, Anguilla and Cyprus).

Rankings
Harneys is ranked in most of the jurisdictions in which it practices (normally in Band 1) of various international legal directories. As of 2014, Harney's ratings include:

Footnotes

Offshore law firms
Law firms established in 1960
1960 establishments in the British Virgin Islands
Offshore magic circle
Companies of the British Virgin Islands
Law firms of the Cayman Islands